Vice Admiral Sir Timothy James Hamilton Laurence,  (born 1 March 1955) is a retired Royal Navy officer and husband of Anne, Princess Royal, the only sister of King Charles III. Laurence was equerry to Queen Elizabeth II from 1986 to 1989.

Early life and education
Timothy James Hamilton Laurence was born on 1 March 1955 in Camberwell, South London, the son of Commander Guy Stewart Laurence, RN (1896–1982; also salesman for a marine engine manufacturer), and Barbara Alison Laurence (née Symons, c. 1929–2019). He has an older brother, Jonathan Dobree Laurence (born 1952). The Laurences descend from Zaccaria Levy, a Jewish merchant who arrived in England from Venice (and possibly initially from Baghdad) in the late 18th century. The family name was later changed to Laurence.

Laurence was educated at The New Beacon Preparatory School and then at Sevenoaks School, Kent, and University College, University of Durham, on a Naval Scholarship, where he received a Bachelor of Science upper 2nd class honours degree in geography. At university, he edited the student newspaper, Palatinate.

Naval career
Laurence was commissioned a midshipman in the Royal Navy on 1 January 1973 and made an acting sub-lieutenant on 1 January 1975. He was promoted to lieutenant 10 months early, on 1 March 1977. In 1978, Laurence was attached to the training establishment  and in the next year served on the Ton-class minesweeper HMS Pollington.

Laurence then served briefly as the second Navigating Officer of the Royal Yacht HMY Britannia, and from 1980 to 1982 he was Navigating Officer of the destroyer . He took command of the patrol boat HMS Cygnet off Northern Ireland in 1982, as part of the patrols for IRA gun-runners. For his services he was mentioned in despatches.

After attending  for the Principal Warfare Officer course, Laurence was promoted to lieutenant commander on 1 March 1985, and posted to the frigate . He attended the Royal Australian Navy Tactics Course at HMAS Watson, Sydney, in March 1986 during which he was notified of his first staff appointment as Equerry to the Queen, a post he held from 11 October 1986 until 16 September 1989. He was promoted to commander on 31 December 1988.

In October 1989, Laurence was posted to the new frigate , and took over as commanding officer on 30 January 1990, at age 34. Between 1992 and 1994, Laurence served on the naval staff in the Ministry of Defence, London. On 16 May 1994, he was appointed the first military assistant to the Secretary of State for Defence, Malcolm Rifkind, to provide military advice in his private office.

Laurence was promoted to captain on 30 June 1995, and until 1996 commanded the frigate . In May 1996, the ship returned from the Adriatic, where HMS Cumberland served in the NATO-led IFOR Task Force. On 27 August 1996, Laurence was appointed Commanding Officer of the frigate  as well as Captain of the 6th Frigate Squadron. Until October 1996, the ship was deployed to the South Atlantic, on Falkland Islands patrol. In July 1997, Laurence returned to the Ministry of Defence, first on the Naval Staff and then from June 1998, on promotion to commodore, as a member of the Implementation Team for the 1998 Strategic Defence Review.

Later career
From January 1999, Laurence was Hudson Visiting Fellow at St Antony's College, Oxford, where he wrote a paper on the relationship between humanitarian assistance and peacekeeping. He was then posted to the Joint Services Command and Staff College as a commodore, as assistant commandant (Navy), effective 15 June 1999. From 2001 to the spring of 2004, Laurence was back at the Ministry of Defence, as Director of Navy Resources and Programmes.

Laurence was promoted to rear admiral on 5 July 2004, and appointed Assistant Chief of the Defence Staff with responsibility for Resources and Plans. On 30 April 2007, he was promoted to vice admiral, and appointed chief executive of Defence Estates (later renamed Defence Infrastructure Organisation).

Laurence became Head of Profession for the British Government's Property Asset Management community in July 2009. The community includes practitioners in construction procurement, estates and property management, and facilities/contracts management. The Royal Institution of Chartered Surveyors (RICS) made Laurence an Honorary Member in 2009.

Laurence retired from the navy in August 2010 and now pursues a portfolio of mainly non-executive and charitable interests, with a particular emphasis on property and regeneration. He was on the board of the project management company Capita Symonds until 2014 and is non-executive chairman of the property developers Dorchester Regeneration. He is non-executive chairman of Purfleet Centre Regeneration, a newly established company specialising in site reclamation and regeneration. He was a senior military adviser to PA Consulting until 2015.

Laurence was chairman of the English Heritage Trust between April 2015 and December 2022 and until 30 June 2019 was vice chairman of the Commonwealth War Graves Commission. He is a trustee of the HMS Victory Preservation Company. His transport interests include membership of the Great Western Advisory Board.

Marriage
Laurence met Princess Anne when he served as an equerry to Queen Elizabeth II in 1986, at a time when it was much rumoured that her first marriage to Captain Mark Phillips was breaking down. In 1989, the existence of private letters from Laurence to the Princess was revealed by The Sun newspaper, though it did not name the sender. Buckingham Palace issued a statement: "The stolen letters were addressed to the Princess Royal by Commander Timothy Laurence, the Queen's Equerry. We have nothing to say about the contents of personal letters sent to Her Royal Highness by a friend which were stolen and which are the subject of a police investigation."

Laurence and Princess Anne married on 12 December 1992 in a Church of Scotland ceremony at Crathie Kirk, near Balmoral (the Church of Scotland permits second marriages for divorced people). He received no peerage on marriage, but was made a personal aide-de-camp to the Queen in 2008 and invested in June 2011 as a Knight Commander of the Royal Victorian Order.

Princess Anne kept her country estate, Gatcombe Park in Gloucestershire, after her divorce from Mark Phillips. After her marriage to Laurence, the couple leased, as their London residence, a flat in the Dolphin Square complex in Westminster. They later returned to apartments in Buckingham Palace and now have an apartment at St James's Palace.

Honours

 1983 (18 October): Mentioned in Despatches for distinguished service in Northern Ireland during the period 1 February 1983 to 30 April 1983.
 2004 (1 August): Appointed Personal Aide-de-Camp to the Queen (ADC)

Authored articles

References

External links
 

1955 births
Living people
Alumni of University College, Durham
Anne, Princess Royal
Companions of the Order of the Bath
Equerries
English geographers
Graduates of Britannia Royal Naval College
Knights Commander of the Royal Victorian Order
People educated at Sevenoaks School
People from Camberwell
Royal Navy vice admirals
Mountbatten-Windsor family
English people of Jewish descent